Line 11 of Suzhou Rail Transit is an under construction rapid transit line. It is formerly known as Line S1 during planning and construction. Construction started on November 27, 2018 and is scheduled to be completed by 2023. The line will use 6-car Type B rolling stock operating up to 100 km/h.

Description
Running west-east, the line will mainly serve the urban area of Kunshan, and connect it to Suzhou Industrial Park in the west and nearby Shanghai in the east via a transfer at Huaqiao station to Line 11 of Shanghai Metro. The line will be the first metro line in downtown Kunshan.

Stations

Through service
Through service between Line 3 and Line 11 will start in late 2023.

References

Suzhou Rail Transit lines